The 2008 All-Pro Team is composed of the National Football League (NFL) players that were named to the Associated Press (AP), Pro Football Writers Association (PFWA), and Sporting News All-Pro Teams in 2008. These are the current teams that historically appear in Total Football: The Official Encyclopedia of the NFL. Although the NFL has no official awards, according to the NFL spokesman Greg Aiello, the NFL Record and Fact Book has historically listed All-Pro teams from major news sources such as the Associated Press, Sporting News, Pro Football Writers Association, as well as teams from organizations that no longer release All-Pro teams such as Newspaper Enterprise Association and United Press International.

The AP team is selected by a national panel of 50 media members, and it lists both first and second teams. The Sporting News surveyed 664 players, coaches, and general managers to determine its All-Pro team. The Pro Football Writers Association's All-NFL team results from the votes of over 300 members as well as from the editors and writers of Pro Football Weekly, who present the PFWA awards.

Teams

 Only the AP designates fullbacks.
 The Sporting News groups all linebackers together, while the AP and PFWA have separate awards for outside and inside linebackers.
 The AP names two inside linebackers, while the Sporting News and PFWA name only one
The AP does not designate a punt returner.
Only PFWA designates a special teams player.

Key
 AP = Associated Press first-team All-Pro
 AP-2 = Associated Press second-team All-Pro
 AP-2t = Tied for second-team All-Pro in the AP vote
 PFWA = Pro Football Writers Association All-NFL
 SN = Sporting News All-Pro

References

All-Pro Teams
Allpro